Christo Louw is a South African rugby league player for the Tuks Bulls. His position is prop. He is a South African international, and has played in the 2013 Rugby League World Cup qualifying against Jamaica and the USA.

References

 newshandle.com

Rugby league props
South Africa national rugby league team players
South African rugby league players
Tuks Bulls players